Edward Catchpole Holder (26 July 1908 – 2 July 1974) was a New Zealand rugby union and rugby league player. A three-quarter, Holder represented the Buller Rugby Union at a provincial level, and was a member of the New Zealand national rugby union side, the All Blacks, in 1932 and 1934. He played 10 matches for the All Blacks including one international. After missing selection for the 1935 All Black tour to Britain, Holder switched to rugby league and played in England, first for Streatham and Mitcham and then for Wigan. He was subsequently reinstated to rugby union during World War II.

Holder was educated at Nelson College from 1922 to 1924.

References

1908 births
1974 deaths
Buller rugby union players
Dominion XIII rugby league team players
New Zealand international rugby union players
New Zealand rugby league players
New Zealand rugby union players
People educated at Nelson College
Rugby league centres
Rugby league players from West Coast, New Zealand
Rugby league wingers
Rugby union players from West Coast, New Zealand
Streatham and Mitcham R.L.F.C. players
Wigan Warriors players